Bridgwater North railway station was the terminus of the Bridgwater Railway, which ran from a junction with the Somerset and Dorset Joint Railway at Edington, between 1890 and 1954. Although often regarded as part of the Somerset and Dorset Joint Railway, and effectively worked as part of that system, the Bridgwater Railway remained nominally independent until the railway Grouping of 1923 when it was vested in the Somerset and Dorset Joint Railway group.

The Station
Originally named Bridgwater, the station was opened on 21 July 1890. It was renamed Bridgwater North in 1949 when it came under British Railways ownership, to avoid confusion with the larger former Great Western Railway (GWR) station in the town. The station consisted of an island platform with a canopy, goods yard and a connection to riverside wharves.

Closure
The passenger station closed when the branch service was withdrawn on 1 December 1952. The line to Edington Burtle via Cossington was closed completely in 1954 after goods traffic was diverted over a new connection to the GWR docks branch which continued until 1962. Bridgwater railway station remains open on the Bristol to Taunton Line.

The site is now occupied by a Sainsbury's supermarket and an adjacent large retail park.

References
 
 Harrison, J. D. (1990). The Bridgwater Railway. Wallingford: The Oakwood Press.

External links
 S&DJR stations - Bridgwater
 Station on navigable O.S. map

Disused railway stations in Somerset
Former Somerset and Dorset Joint Railway stations
Railway stations in Great Britain opened in 1890
Railway stations in Great Britain closed in 1952
Bridgwater
1890 establishments in England
1952 disestablishments in England